The Front Room Gallery is a contemporary art gallery located at 48 Hester Street in New York, NY. The directors are Daniel Aycock and Kathleen Vance.

History

Since 1999 The Front Room Gallery has been dedicated to exhibiting artwork for emerging and mid-career artists with a concentration on photography, conceptual art, video, audio art, sculpture, and installation. The Front Room shows works that are at times ephemeral, conceptual or noncommercial in nature and supports a program that includes The Banner Project (public exhibition space) and hosts the multiples and editions program entitled Fuseworks (featured works by national and international artists.)

Featured artists

Peter Fox
Paul Raphaelson

References

External links
http://frontroomles.com
https://web.archive.org/web/20100918050214/http://artlog.com/venues/281-front-room-gallery
http://www.brooklynrail.org/2010/10/artseen/stephen-mallon-next-stop-atlantic
http://www.artcat.com/neighborhoods/2

https://web.archive.org/web/20110721140222/http://www.thelmagazine.com/newyork/stephen-mallon-next-stop-atlantic/Event?oid=1738361
http://www.wagmag.org/galleries.php
http://www.artnet.com/magazineus/reviews/maine/maine10-4-05.asp
http://www.brooklynrail.org/2006/12/artseen/eric-guzman
http://www.newyorkcool.com/archives/2007/March/arts-fountain.htm
http://www.thenewyorkartworld.com/pastIssue/MayEditorial2007.html#review02
http://vernissage.tv/blog/2008/11/02/bridge-art-fair-berlin-2008/

Manhattan
Art galleries established in 1999
1999 establishments in New York City
Williamsburg, Brooklyn